Lukas Enembe (born 27 July 1967) is an Indonesian politician who served as the 13th Governor of Papua Province from April 2013 to January 2023. He had previously served as Regent of Puncak Jaya Regency between 2007 and 2012, and Vice Regent of the same regency from 2001 until 2006.

In September 2017, Enembe was called on by the Corruption Eradication Commission as a suspect in a graft case, and later he is named as a witness in a graft case involving misappropriation of scholarship funds in Papua. Five years later, in September 2022, the Corruption Eradication Commission reported that Enembe is a suspect for misappropriation of government funds as he spent the money in casinos in Singapore and Australia. 

In January 2023, he was arrested by Indonesia Corruption Eradication Commission.

Early life and education, and early career
Lukas Enembe was born Lomato Enembe on 27 July 1967 in Kampung Mamit, Kembu District in what is now Tolikara Regency, to Tagolenggawak Enembe (father) and Deyaknobukwe Enumbi (mother). He spent his childhood in Tolikara, including his elementary school years; he studied at YPPGI Elementary School in his village of Kampung Mamit and graduated in 1980. It was during his years in YPPGI Elementary that young Lomato began to be known as Lukas; he was frequently called Lukas by his teacher and friends, and the name has been used ever since. He is a member of the Koteka people who inhabit the western New Guinea highlands.

Originally after graduating elementary school, Lukas attempted to enroll in a junior high school in Mulia, Puncak Jaya Regency, where his mother came from; the plan was to find a relative from his mother's side to live with until he finished junior high school. Enembe couldn't find any of his mother's relatives; he then moved to Sentani, Jayapura Regency to study in what is now SMP Negeri 1 Sentani (Sentani 1st State Junior High School) from 1980 until 1983. Immediately after, he continued to study in SMA Negeri 3 Sentani (Sentani 3rd State Junior High School) and graduated in 1986. He then enrolled at Sam Ratulangi University in Sulawesi, studying political science. Enembe returned to Papua in 1995, and was accepted as a civil servant in 1996. He unsuccessfully tried to become a lecturer at Cenderawasih University in Jayapura, and later accepted an offer as a civil servant in Merauke Regency, Papua. From 1998-2001, Enembe studied at Cornerstone Christian College in New South Wales, Australia, having been sent by a missionary agency.

Political career
In 2001, Enembe unsuccessfully participated in the election to become regent of Puncak Jaya Regency. From 2001 to 2006 he served as Vice Regent of Puncak Jaya Regency alongside Elieser Renmaur. In 2006 he was elected to the chair of the local Papuan division of the Indonesian Democratic Party. Also in 2006 he unsuccessfully ran for the office of governor of Papua Province. In 2007, he was elected as the regent of Puncak Jaya Regency. In 2013 Enembe successfully ran for the governorship of Papua Province, serving alongside Klemen Tinal as vice-governor, and was re-elected to the position alongside Tinal in 2018. Due to his arrest for alleged embezzlement, Enembe was declared "temporarily absent" as a governor. Ridwan Rumasukun, then Regional Secretary of Papua Province, was appointed as acting governor on 11 January 2023.

Embezzlement allegations
In September 2017, Enembe was called on by the Corruption Eradication Commission as a suspect in a graft case; supporters of Enembe protested at the National Human Rights Commission, claiming that the issue was politicized due to the 2018 gubernatorial election in Papua. The Commission later named Enembe as a witness in a graft case involving misappropriation of scholarship funds in Papua, and Enembe met with the Commission face-to-face to clarify his wealth report.

In September 2022, it was reported that Enembe was under investigation by Indonesia's Anti-Corruption Commission for allegedly since 2017 having misappropriated 560 billion rupiah (approximately $56 million AUD) of state funds, reportedly spending a significant proportion of the money at casinos in Singapore and Australia. Enembe's reported official salary was less than AUD$1,000 (approximately 10 million rupiah) a month. Enembe denied the charges, claiming that they were politically motivated due to his membership of the Democratic Party. Enembe is declared as a suspect in the case, instead of merely a witness by the Corruption Eradication Commission. 

During the investigation, Enembe claimed that he can't answer the summons by the Anti-Corruption Commission to go to Jakarta for questioning as he has problems speaking and moving, and he also has a neurological disorder. The Anti-Corruption Commission agreed to conduct the questioning in his own home. He is guarded by hundreds of locals armed with bows while he is being questioned by Indonesia's Anti-Corruption Commission in his own home.

Arrest 
In 10 January 2023, Enembe is arrested by Corruption Eradication Commission. After his arrest, some of his supporters attacked a Indonesian National Police Mobile Brigade Corps base in Jayapura, Papua with arrows and rocks. Some of his supporters also carried sharp weapons, but his supporters are dispersed by the police without further incident. Nineteen of his supporters are arrested by the police. Enembe is immediately flown to Jakarta, and the police claimed that there are no further incidents in Jayapura. During the scuffle in Sentani Airport while Enembe is being flown out to Jakarta three of his supporters are shot by the police. Two of them are injured, and one of them died.

Personal life
Enembe is married to Yulce Wenda, and has three children; Astract Bona T.M. Enembe, Eldorado Gamael Enumbi, and Dario Alvin Nells Isak Enembe.

The Lukas Enembe Stadium in Jayapura Regency, used as venue for the opening ceremony of Indonesia's 2020 National Sports Week is named after him.

References

1967 births
Living people
People from Highland Papua
Papuan people
Democratic Party (Indonesia) politicians
Governors of Papua (province)
Regents of places in Indonesia
Sam Ratulangi University alumni
Indonesian politicians convicted of corruption